Giuseppe Spinucci (1617–1695) was a Roman Catholic prelate who served as Bishop of Penne e Atri (1668–1695).

Biography
Giuseppe Spinucci was born in Fermo, Italy in 1617 and ordained a priest on 6 Jan 1661.
On 14 May 1668, he was appointed during the papacy of Pope Clement IX as Bishop of Penne e Atri.
On 21 May 1668, he was consecrated bishop by Francesco Maria Brancaccio, Cardinal-Bishop of Frascati, with Stefano Brancaccio, Titular Archbishop of Hadrianopolis in Haemimonto, and Giuseppe della Corgna, Bishop of Orvieto, serving as co-consecrators. 
He served as Bishop of Penne e Atri until his death on 7 Dec 1695.

References

External links and additional sources
 (Chronology of Bishops) 
 (Chronology of Bishops) 

17th-century Italian Roman Catholic bishops
Bishops appointed by Pope Clement IX
1617 births
1695 deaths